Netechma simulans is a species of moth of the family Tortricidae. It is found in Napo Province, Ecuador.

The wingspan is 25 mm for males and 27 mm for females. The ground colour of the forewings is white with black markings. The hindwings are whitish, but cream on the periphery.

Etymology
The species name refers to the resemblance to other species and is derived from Latin simulo (meaning feign).

References

Moths described in 2009
Netechma